Club Baloncesto Lucentum Alicante is a professional basketball team based in Alicante, Valencian Community. Lucentum Alicante played in Liga ACB for the last time in 2012, after selling its place in the league to CB Canarias.

In August 2015, due to its financial problems, it gave its place in LEB Plata to the Fundación Lucentum Baloncesto, created two months before to save the basketball of the city.

Sponsorship naming
Lucentum Alicante has had several sponsorship names during its history:

Ernesto Electrodomésticos 1994–1996
Proaguas Costablanca 2000–2001
Etosa Alicante 2002–2007
Alicante Costablanca 2007–2008
Meridiano Alicante 2009–2011

Team logos

Players

Season by season

Trophies and awards

Trophies
LEB Oro: (2)
2000, 2002
Copa Príncipe: (2)
2002, 2009
Lliga Valenciana: (3)
2004, 2006, 2011

Individual awards
All-ACB Team
Lou Roe – 2004

Notable former players
 Lucio Angulo
 José Manuel Calderón
 Juan Ignacio Sánchez
 Pablo Prigioni
 Andy Rautins
 Mindaugas Katelynas
 Martynas Andriuškevičius
 Velimir Perasović
 Vule Avdalović
 Lou Roe
 Kyle Singler
 Serkan Erdoğan
 Kaloyan Ivanov

References

External links
CB Lucentum Alicante Official Website

 
Lucentum
Lucentum
Basketball teams established in 1994
Basketball teams disestablished in 2015
Former Liga ACB teams
Basketball teams in the Valencian Community